K33 or K-33 may refer to:
 K-33 (Kansas highway)
 K-33 truck, an American military truck
 , a corvette of the Swedish Navy
 Kissaviarsuk-33, a sports club from Greenland
 Kyrie in F major, K. 33, by Wolfgang Amadeus Mozart
 Potassium-33, an isotope of potassium
 Salem Memorial Airport, in Dent County, Missouri, United States
 
 K3,3, the complete bipartite graph on 3 vertices